Half the Man may refer to:

 "Half the Man" (Clint Black song), 1994
 "Half the Man" (Jamiroquai song), 1994
 "Creep" (Stone Temple Pilots song), 1993